The 2020 Miami Marlins season was the 28th season for the Major League Baseball (MLB) franchise in the National League and the 9th as the "Miami" Marlins. The Marlins played their home games at Marlins Park as members of the National League East Division. On September 25, with a 4–3 victory in 10 innings against the New York Yankees, the Marlins secured second place in the NL East, clinching their first playoff berth since 2003. Although they did not improve upon their win-total from the previous year (partially due to the pandemic), they still made the playoffs in the 60-game season. The Marlins became just the second team in MLB history to reach the postseason the season after losing at least 100 games, joining the 2017 Minnesota Twins. They subsequently swept the Chicago Cubs in the Wild Card Series before losing in a three-game sweep to the Atlanta Braves in the Division Series, marking their first postseason series loss in franchise history.

On March 12, 2020, MLB announced that because of the ongoing COVID-19 pandemic, the start of the regular season would be delayed by at least two weeks in addition to the remainder of spring training being cancelled. Four days later, it was announced that the start of the season would be pushed back indefinitely due to the recommendation made by the CDC to restrict events of more than 50 people for eight weeks. On June 23, commissioner Rob Manfred unilaterally implemented a 60-game season. Players reported to training camps on July 1 in order to resume spring training and prepare for a July 24 Opening Day.

Regular season
On April 28–30, the Marlins were supposed to play against the New York Mets in the Puerto Rico Series in San Juan. But due to the pandemic, MLB cancelled the Series.

Game log

|- style="background:#cfc;"
| 1 || July 24 || @ Phillies || 5–2 || Alcántara (1–0) || Nola (0–1) || Kintzler (1) || 1–0 || W1
|- style="background:#fbb;"
| 2 || July 25 || @ Phillies || 1–7 || Wheeler (1–0) || Vesia (0–1) || — || 1–1 || L1
|- style="background:#cfc;"
| 3 || July 26 || @ Phillies || 11–6 || Tarpley (1–0) || Irvin (0–1) || — || 2–1 || W1
|- style="background:#bbb;"
| — || July 27 || Orioles || colspan=7 | Postponed (COVID-19); Makeup: Aug 5
|- style="background:#bbb;" 
| — || July 28 || Orioles || colspan=7 | Postponed (COVID-19); Makeup: Aug 6
|- style="background:#bbb;"
| — || July 29 || @ Orioles || colspan=7 | Postponed (COVID-19); Makeup: Aug 4
|- style="background:#bbb;"
| — || July 30 || @ Orioles || colspan=7 | Postponed (COVID-19); Makeup: Aug 5
|- style="background:#bbb;"
| — || July 31 || Nationals || colspan=7 | Postponed (COVID-19); Makeup: Aug 22 
|-

|- style="background:#bbb;"
| — || August 1 || Nationals || colspan=7 | Postponed (COVID-19); Makeup: Sep 18
|- style="background:#bbb;"
| — || August 2 || Nationals || colspan=7 | Postponed (COVID-19); Makeup: Sep 20
|- style="background:#bbb;"
| — || August 4 || Phillies || colspan=7 | Postponed (COVID-19); Makeup: Sep 11 
|- style="background:#cfc;"
| 4 || August 4 || @ Orioles || 4–0 || López (1–0) || Means (0–1) || — || 3–1 || W2
|- style="background:#bbb;"
| — || August 5 || Phillies || colspan=7 | Postponed (COVID-19); Makeup: Sep 13 
|- style="background:#cfc;"
| 5 || August 5  || @ Orioles || 1–0  || Vincent (1–0) || Cobb (1–1) || Kintzler (2) || 4–1 || W3
|- style="background:#cfc;"
| 6 || August 5  || Orioles || 2–1 || Moran (1–0) || Wojciechowski (0–2) || Tarpley (1) || 5–1 || W4
|- style="background:#bbb;"
| — || August 6 || Phillies || colspan=7 | Postponed (COVID-19); Makeup: Sep 14
|- style="background:#cfc;"
| 7 || August 6 || Orioles || 8–7 || Morin (1–0) || Phillips (1–1) || Kintzler (3) || 6–1 || W5
|- style="background:#cfc;"
|8 || August 7 || @ Mets || 4–3 || Tarpley (2–0) || Wacha (1–2) || Vincent (1) || 7–1 || W6
|- style="background:#fbb;"
| 9 || August 8 || @ Mets || 4–8 || Peterson (2–1) || Castano (0–1) || — || 7–2 || L1
|- style="background:#fbb;"
| 10 || August 9 || @ Mets || 2–4 || deGrom (2–0) || López (1–1) || Lugo (3) || 7–3 || L2
|- style="background:#fbb;"
| 11 || August 11 || @ Blue Jays || 4–5  || Cole (1–0) || Tarpley (2–1) || — || 7–4 || L3
|- style="background:#cfc;"
| 12 || August 12 || @ Blue Jays || 14–11  || Kintzler (1–0) || Dolis (0–1) || Smith (1) || 8–4 || W1
|- style="background:#cfc;"
| 13 || August 14 || Braves || 8–2 || López (2–1) || Wright (0–3) || — || 9–4 || W2
|- style="background:#fbb;"
| 14 || August 15 || Braves || 1–2 || Smith (1–0) || Kintzler (1–1) || Melancon (4) || 9–5 || L1
|- style="background:#fbb;"
| 15 || August 16 || Braves || 0–4 || O'Day (2–0) || Vincent (1–1) || — || 9–6 || L2
|- style="background:#fbb;"
| 16 || August 17 || Mets || 4–11 || Shreve (1–0) || Yamamoto (0–1) || Kilome (1) || 9–7 || L3
|- style="background:#fbb;"
| 17 || August 18 || Mets || 3–8 || Wilson (1–1) || Mejía (0–1) || — || 9–8 || L4
|- style="background:#fbb;"
| 18 || August 19 || Mets || 3–5 || Díaz (1–0) || Kintzler (1–2) || — || 9–9 || L5
|- style="background:#bbb;"
| — || August 20 || Mets || colspan=7 | Postponed (COVID-19); Makeup: Aug 25 
|- style="background:#cfc;"
| 19 || August 21 || @ Nationals || 3–2 || Hernández (1–0) || Corbin (2–2) || Kintzler (4) || 10–9 || W1
|- style="background:#fbb;"
| 20 || August 22  || @ Nationals || 4–5  || Finnegan (1–0) || Castano (0–2) || Hudson (6) || 10–10 || L1
|- style="background:#cfc;"
| 21 || August 22  || Nationals || 5–3  || Sánchez (1–0) || Crowe (0–1) || Kintzler (5) || 11–10 || W1
|- style="background:#fbb;"
| 22 || August 23 || @ Nationals || 3–9 || Sánchez (1–3) || Mejía (0–2) || — || 11–11 || L1
|- style="background:#cfc;"
| 23 || August 24 || @ Nationals || 11–8 || López (3–1) || Voth (0–3) || Kintzler (6) || 12–11 || W1
|- style="background:#cfc;"
| 24 || August 25  || @ Mets || 4–0  || Bleier (1–0) || Porcello (1–2) || — || 13–11 || W2
|- style="background:#cfc;"
| 25 || August 25  || Mets || 3–0  || Smith (1–0) || Hughes (0–1) || Vincent (2) || 14–11 || W3
|- style="background:#fbb;"
| 26 || August 26 || @ Mets || 4–5 || Brach (1–0) || Vincent (1–2) || — || 14–12 || L1
|- style="background:#bbb;"
| — || August 27 || @ Mets || colspan=7 | Postponed (strikes due to shooting of Jacob Blake); Makeup: Aug 31  
|- style="background:#fbb;"
| 27 || August 28 || Rays || 0–2 || Fairbanks (4–1) || Bleier (1–1) || Castillo (2) || 14–13 || L2
|- style="background:#fbb;"
| 28 || August 29 || Rays || 0–4 || Fleming (2–0) || López (3–2) || — || 14–14 || L3
|- style="background:#fbb;"
| 29 || August 30 || Rays || 7–12 || Snell (3–0) || Alcántara (1–1) || — || 14–15 || L4
|- style="background:#cfc;" 
| 30 || August 31 || @ Mets || 5–3 || Rogers (1–0) || deGrom (2–1) || Kintzler (7) || 15–15 || W1 
|-

|- style="background:#cfc;"
| 31 || September 1 || Blue Jays || 3–2 || Hoyt (1–0) || Yamaguchi (1–3) || Kintzler (8) || 16–15 || W2
|- style="background:#fbb;"
| 32 || September 2 || Blue Jays || 1–2 || Ryu (3–1) || Sánchez (1–1) || Bass (4) || 16–16 || L1
|- style="background:#fbb;"
| 33 || September 4 || @ Rays || 4–5 || Fleming (3–0) || López (3–3) || Anderson (4) || 16–17 || L2
|- style="background:#cfc;"
| 34 || September 5 || @ Rays || 7–3 || Alcántara (2–1) || Snell (3–1) || Kintzler (9) || 17–17 || W1
|- style="background:#fbb;"
| 35 || September 6 || @ Rays || 4–5  || Curtiss (3–0) || Kintzler (1–3) || — || 17–18 || L1
|- style="background:#cfc;"
| 36 || September 7 || @ Braves || 5–4  || Kintzler (2–3) || Minter (1–1) || Vincent (3) || 18–18 || W1
|- style="background:#cfc;"
| 37 || September 8 || @ Braves || 8–0 || Sánchez (2–1) || Wright (0–4) || — || 19–18 || W2
|- style="background:#fbb;"
| 38 || September 9 || @ Braves || 9–29 || Dayton (2–0) || López (3–4) || Wilson (1) || 19–19 || L1
|- style="background:#cfc;"
| 39 || September 10 || Phillies || 7–6 || García (1–0) || Workman (1–2) || — || 20–19 || W1
|- style="background:#fbb;"
| 40 || September 11  || Phillies || 0–11  || Nola (5–3) || Rogers (1–1) || — || 20–20 || L1
|- style="background:#cfc;"
| 41 || September 11  || Phillies || 5–3  || Hoyt (2–0) || Suárez (0–1) || García (1) || 21–20 || W1
|- style="background:#fbb;"
| 42 || September 12 || Phillies || 6–12 || Hembree (3–0) || Ureña (0–1) || — || 21–21 || L1
|- style="background:#cfc;"
| 43 ||  || Phillies || 2–1  || Sánchez (3–1) || Rosso (0–1) || — || 22–21 || W1
|- style="background:#cfc;" 
| 44 || September 13  || Phillies || 8–1  || Garrett (1–0) || Eflin (2–2) || — || 23–21 || W2
|- style="background:#cfc;"
| 45 || September 14 || Phillies || 6–2 || López (4–4) || Velasquez (0–1) || — || 24–21 || W3
|- style="background:#fbb;"
| 46 || September 15 || Red Sox || 0–2 || Houck (1–0) || Alcántara (2–2) || Barnes (7) || 24–22 || L1
|- style="background:#cfc;"
| 47 || September 16 || Red Sox || 8–4 || García (2–0) || Kickham (1–1) || — || 25–22 || W1
|- style="background:#fbb;"
| 48 || September 17 || Red Sox || 3–5 || Eovaldi (3–2) || Ureña (0–2) || Barnes (8) || 25–23 || L1
|- style="background:#fbb;"
| 49 || September 18  || Nationals || 0–5  || Fedde (2–3) || Sánchez (3–2) || — || 25–24 || L2
|- style="background:#cfc;"
| 50 || September 18  || Nationals || 14–3  || García (3–0) || Crowe (0–2) || — || 26–24 || W1
|- style="background:#cfc;"
| 51 || September 19 || Nationals || 7–3 || López (5–4) || Corbin (2–6) || — || 27–24 || W2
|- style="background:#cfc;"
| 52 || September 20  || Nationals || 2–1  || Alcántara (3–2) || Scherzer (4–4) || Kintzler (10) || 28–24 || W3
|- style="background:#fbb;"
| 53 || September 20  || Nationals || 0–15  || Braymer (1–0) || Garrett (1–1) || — || 28–25 || L1
|- style="background:#fbb;"
| 54 || September 21 || @ Braves || 4–5 || Matzek (4–3) || Rogers (1–2) || Melancon (11) || 28–26 || L2
|- style="background:#fbb;"
| 55 || September 22 || @ Braves || 1–11 || Wilson (1–0) || Ureña (0–3) || — || 28–27 || L3
|- style="background:#fbb;"
| 56 || September 23 || @ Braves || 4–9 || Jackson (2–0) || Smith (1–1) || — || 28–28 || L4
|- style="background:#cfc;"
| 57 || September 24 || @ Braves || 4–2 || López (6–4) || Anderson (3–2) || Kintzler (11) || 29–28 || W1
|- style="background:#cfc;"
| 58 || September 25 || @ Yankees || 4–3  || Boxberger (1–0) || Green (3–3) || Kintzler (12) || 30–28 || W2
|- style="background:#fbb;"
| 59 || September 26 || @ Yankees || 4–11 || García (3–2) || Tarpley (2–2) || — || 30–29 || L1
|- style="background:#cfc;"
| 60 || September 27 || @ Yankees || 5–0 || Castano (1–2) || Schmidt (0–1) || — || 31–29 || W1
|-

|-
| Legend:       = Win       = Loss       = PostponementBold = Marlins team member

Season standings

Record vs. opponents

Season summary

COVID-19 outbreak 
On opening day, July 24, 2020, Marlins catcher Jorge Alfaro was placed on the injured list after testing positive for COVID-19. First baseman Garrett Cooper and outfielder Harold Ramírez also tested positive for COVID-19 shortly thereafter. Two days later, prior to the final game of the opening series against the Philadelphia Phillies, scheduled starting pitcher, José Ureña, tested positive for COVID-19 and was scratched from his start. Following the game against the Phillies, the Marlins delayed their flight back to Miami due to concerns of an outbreak.

On July 27, the team's home opener against the Baltimore Orioles was postponed amid reports that eight new players had tested positive for COVID-19. Reports stated that 11 Marlins players and two coaches had tested positive. MLB also postponed the Phillies' next game against the New York Yankees as the Yankees would be using the same clubhouse as the Marlins. The Marlins remained in Philadelphia pending further testing.

On July 28, sources reported that at least four more members of the Marlins had tested positive for COVID-19. In five days, the Marlins had a total of 17 people test positive for the virus. The game scheduled for July 28 was also postponed. On the same day, the MLB announced that the Marlins and Phillies seasons would be put on hold. MLB officially postponed all games for the Marlins through August 2.

On July 30, an 18th player tested positive for COVID-19. The players and coaches who have tested positive are being transported back to Miami while the rest of the team will remain in Philadelphia. It was still uncertain whether the team would return to play on August 4. The team returned to play on August 4 with a roster that included 16 new players after 18 players and two coaches ended up testing positive. The Marlins placed a total of 17 players on the injured list and had an eighth player, Isan Díaz opt out of the remainder of the season. The game against the Orioles was delayed 40 minutes as MLB waited for final test results to be received. The Marlins went on to win their first five games after returning to play.

Achievements 
On August 7, manager Don Mattingly won his 282nd game as manager of the Marlins, becoming the winningest manager in Marlins' franchise history.

Postseason

Game log

|- style="background:#cfc;"
| 1 || September 30 || @ Cubs || 5–1 || Alcántara (1–0) || Hendricks (0–1) || — || 1–0 || W1
|- style="background:#bbb;" 
| — || October 1 || @ Cubs || colspan="8" |Postponed (inclement weather)
|- style="background:#cfc;"
| 2 || October 2 || @ Cubs || 2–0 || Boxberger (1–0) || Darvish (0–1) || Kintzler (1) || 2–0 || W2
|-

|- style="background:#fbb;"
| 1 || October 6 || @ Braves || 5–9 || Smith (1–0) || Alcántara (0–1) || — || 0–1 || L1
|- style="background:#fbb;"
| 2 || October 7 || @ Braves || 0–2 || Anderson (1–0) || López (0–1) || Melancon (1) || 0–2 || L2
|- style="background:#fbb;"
| 3 || October 8 || Braves || 0–7 || Wright (1–0) || Sánchez (0–1) || — || 0–3 || L3
|-
| colspan=9 | 
|-

Postseason rosters

| style="text-align:left" |
Pitchers: 22 Sandy Alcántara 27 Brandon Kintzler 33 Brad Boxberger 35 Richard Bleier 37 Stephen Tarpley 39 James Hoyt 49 Pablo López 55 Ryne Stanek 59 Nick Neidert 73 Sixto Sánchez 93 Yimi García 94 Braxton Garrett 95 Trevor Rogers 
Catchers: 17 Chad Wallach 38 Jorge Alfaro 
Infielders: 5 Jon Berti 15 Brian Anderson 19 Miguel Rojas 26 Garrett Cooper 68 Lewin Díaz 70 Jazz Chisholm Jr.
Outfielders: 4 Monte Harrison 6 Starling Marte 7 Matt Joyce 23 Corey Dickerson 25 Lewis Brinson 34 Magneuris Sierra 
Designated hitters: 24 Jesús Aguilar
|- valign="top"

| style="text-align:left" |
Pitchers: 22 Sandy Alcántara 27 Brandon Kintzler 33 Brad Boxberger 35 Richard Bleier 39 James Hoyt 44 Nick Vincent 49 Pablo López 55 Ryne Stanek 59 Nick Neidert 72 Daniel Castano 73 Sixto Sánchez 93 Yimi García 94 Braxton Garrett 95 Trevor Rogers
Catchers: 17 Chad Wallach 38 Jorge Alfaro
Infielders: 5 Jon Berti 13 Sean Rodriguez 15 Brian Anderson 19 Miguel Rojas 26 Garrett Cooper 70 Jazz Chisholm Jr.
Outfielders: 4 Monte Harrison 7 Matt Joyce 23 Corey Dickerson 25 Lewis Brinson 34 Magneuris Sierra  
Designated hitters: 24 Jesús Aguilar
|- valign="top"

Roster

Farm system

See also

References

External links
2020 Miami Marlins season at Baseball Reference

Miami Marlins season
Miami Marlins
Miami Marlins seasons